Chris Taripo is an Australian rugby league player who represented Cook Islands in the 2013 World Cup.

Playing career
Taripo played for the Sydney Roosters in the under-20's Holden Cup. In 2013 he played for the Newtown Jets in the NSW Cup and won their most improved player award.

In 2013, Taripo was named in the Cook Islands squad for the World Cup. He scored a hat-trick in the Cook Island's 16–22 loss to Tonga.

References

1992 births
Australian rugby league players
Australian people of Cook Island descent
Cook Islands national rugby league team players
Newtown Jets NSW Cup players
Rugby league wingers
Living people